Killers is the second studio album by English heavy metal band Iron Maiden. It was first released on 16 February 1981 in the United Kingdom by EMI Records and on 11 May in the United States by Harvest and Capitol Records. The album was their first with guitarist Adrian Smith, and their last with vocalist Paul Di'Anno, who was fired after problems with his stage performances arose due to his alcohol and cocaine use. Killers was also the first Iron Maiden album recorded with producer Martin Birch, who went on to produce their next eight albums until Fear of the Dark (1992).

Background

Killers is the only Iron Maiden album to feature two instrumentals. It was written almost exclusively by Steve Harris; only "Twilight Zone" and the title track are cowritten.

Bar "Murders in the Rue Morgue" (based on the story of the same name by Edgar Allan Poe) and "Prodigal Son", the songs were written in the years prior to the recording of their debut album. No songs were recorded professionally until the Killers sessions, with the exception of "Wrathchild" (a version recorded in 1979 was featured on the Metal for Muthas compilation).

"The Ides of March" is nearly identical to "Thunderburst", by fellow British NWOBHM band Samson, who featured a pre-Maiden Bruce Dickinson on vocals; however, "The Ides of March" was written during the brief time in 1977 in which future Samson drummer Thunderstick was a member of Iron Maiden. While Harris took sole credit for "The Ides of March", "Thunderburst" is credited to Harris and all four members of Samson's Head On line-up, Bruce Bruce, aka Bruce Dickinson, Chris Aylmer, Paul Samson, and Thunderstick, aka Barry Purkis.

Killers spent eight weeks on the UK chart. The North American edition, which came out a few months later, was initially released on Harvest Records/Capitol Records and subsequently on Sanctuary Records/Columbia Records. The song "Twilight Zone" was added to the album.

The Killer World Tour featured the band's first US shows, beginning at The Aladdin, Las Vegas, in support of Judas Priest. Subsequently, "Wrathchild" is the only regularly played track from the album, appearing in almost all their tours.

Track listing

Covers
The song "Wrathchild" was covered in 2003 by the English metal band Sikth and featured as a B-side on their single "Scent of the Obscene". The song was also covered in 2005 by female tribute band The Iron Maidens on their 2007 album Route 666, by Gallows on the 2008 tribute CD Maiden Heaven: A Tribute to Iron Maiden released by Kerrang! magazine, and by Six Feet Under on the reissue of their 1999 album Maximum Violence. "Wrathchild" was featured in the PlayStation 2 game Guitar Hero Encore: Rocks the 80s.

Personnel
Production and performance credits are adapted from the album liner notes.

Iron Maiden
 Paul Di'Anno – vocals
 Dave Murray – guitars
 Adrian Smith – guitars
 Steve Harris – bass
 Clive Burr – drums

Additional personnel
 Martin "Headmaster" Birch – producer, engineer
 Nigel Hewitt – second engineer
 Derek Riggs – cover illustration
 Dave Lights – cover concept
 Robert Ellis – photography
 Rod Smallwood – band manager, photography (1998 edition)
 Dennis Stratton – guitar on "Women in Uniform", "Invasion", and "Phantom of the Opera" (1995 edition)
 Tony Platt - producer of "Women in Uniform" (1995 edition)
 Simon Heyworth – remastering (1998 edition)
 Ross Halfin – photography (1998 edition)
 P.G. Brunelli – photography (1998 edition)
 Simon Fowler – photography (1998 edition)
 Denis O'Regan – photography (1998 edition)
 George Chin – photography (1998 edition)

Charts

Weekly charts

Year-end charts

Certifications

References

1981 albums
Iron Maiden albums
Albums produced by Martin Birch
EMI Records albums
Albums recorded at Morgan Sound Studios